Suhada Gamlath PC is a Sri Lankan lawyer. He was the 44th Solicitor General of Sri Lanka and temporarily the Attorney General of Sri Lanka from January to February 2016. He was a former Permanent Secretary to the Ministry of Justice and Law Reforms. He was educated at Royal College Colombo and at the Sri Lanka Law College.

References

External links
 Attorney-General's Department

Living people
Sinhalese lawyers
Year of birth missing (living people)
Place of birth missing (living people)
Sri Lankan judges on the courts of Fiji
Attorneys General of Sri Lanka
President's Counsels (Sri Lanka)
Alumni of Royal College, Colombo
Alumni of Sri Lanka Law College
F